Sunstar is a Japanese global oral care, health and beauty, chemicals, and motorcycle parts conglomerate with international affiliates. The corporation has two main wings, healthcare and engineering, each with its own CEO. Its main businesses are the development, manufacturing and sale of oral care products (toothpastes, toothbrushes and dental rinses) as well as of chemical formulations for industrial applications (building materials and automotive) and motorcycle parts (sprockets and braking disks). In recent years it has been expanding into the area of Cosmetics and Health Food.

Sunstar's founder, established the Kaneda Keitai Shokai Company in Osaka, Japan in 1932 as a seller of rubber glue for bicycles. The introduction of metal tubes for packaging of the rubber glue - and later also toothpastes formed the basis for the early success of the business.  The company since has developed into the leading oral care business in Japan with a significant international presence. The engineering business also has a leading position for several of its products in Japan and other markets. Group sales exceeded one billion United States dollars for the first time in the 1990s and are now at the level of 1.4 billion US dollars per year.

After having been listed on the Osaka Securities Exchange since 1961, Sunstar undertook a management and employee buyout of all shares in 2007. The ownership of Sunstar Japan and the other group companies of the Consumer Goods Business was transferred to Switzerland and the Engineering business to Singapore, in an effort to accelerate globalization.

History 

In 1933, he started selling rubber glue for puncture repair packed in a small metal tubes. Until 1946, Kaneda Brother’s Company produced metal tubes and founded Kaneda Light Metal Tube Industries.

In 1946, the company developed its first toothpaste, in a metal tube. Also that year, the company engaged in the production of bicycle parts. In 1948, the company started to sell medical toothpaste.

In 1988, Sunstar acquired the US dental manufacturer, J.O. Butler, Inc. 20 years later, in 2007, Sunstar started the transfer of the headquarters office functions to Switzerland and privatized ownership by management and employee share buyout (delisted from Osaka Securities Exchange).

In 2009, the headquarters building in Switzerland (Sunstar Suisse S.A., Etoy) was completed. A couple of years later, in 2011, Sunstar Acquired Interbros GmbH (German toothbrush and interdental brush manufacturer) as well as Degradable Solutions AG (Swiss bonegraft manufacturer). In 2013, Sunstar established a new product development center for the Industrial and Consumer Business in Singapore. In 2014, the fine blanking automobile metal parts was expanded in Indonesia and Thailand. The company also opened of a new base for the consumer business in Brazil.

In 2015, the second headquarters building in Etoy, Switzerland, was completed.

Main business units and brands 
 Oral Care:  G･U･M, BUTLER, Ora2, formerly the John O. Butler Company, founded in 1923 and purchased by Sunstar in 1988
 Health & Beauty:  	EQUITANCE, SUNSTAR TONIC, KENKODOJO
 Adhesives, Sealants, Chemicals:  PENGUINSEAL, Star Penguin
 Vehicle Safety:  BRAKING, SUNSTAR, PENGUINSEAL, ibike

References 

Chemical companies of Japan
Chemical companies of Switzerland
Conglomerate companies established in 1932
Companies based in Osaka
Companies based in the canton of Vaud
Multinational companies headquartered in Japan
Personal care companies
Dental companies
Midori-kai
Japanese brands
Chemical companies established in 1932
Japanese companies established in 1932